The 1998–99 NBA season was the Warriors' 53rd season in the National Basketball Association, and 37th in the San Francisco Bay Area. On March 23, 1998, the owners of all 29 NBA teams voted 27–2 to reopen the league's collective bargaining agreement, seeking changes to the league's salary cap system, and a ceiling on individual player salaries. The National Basketball Players Association (NBPA) opposed to the owners' plan, and wanted raises for players who earned the league's minimum salary. After both sides failed to reach an agreement, the owners called for a lockout, which began on July 1, 1998, putting a hold on all team trades, free agent signings and training camp workouts, and cancelling many NBA regular season and preseason games. Due to the lockout, the NBA All-Star Game, which was scheduled to be played in Philadelphia on February 14, 1999, was also cancelled. However, on January 6, 1999, NBA commissioner David Stern, and NBPA director Billy Hunter finally reached an agreement to end the lockout. The deal was approved by both the players and owners, and was signed on January 20, ending the lockout after 204 days. The regular season began on February 5, and was cut short to just 50 games instead of the regular 82-game schedule.

In the 1998 NBA draft, the Warriors selected Vince Carter from the University of North Carolina with the fifth overall pick, but soon traded him to the Toronto Raptors in exchange for his college teammate Antawn Jamison. The team also acquired John Starks, Chris Mills and Terry Cummings from the New York Knicks during the off-season; Starks previously played for the Warriors during the 1988–89 season. After losing their first five games, the Warriors started to show signs of improvement, winning four straight games, then hold a 6–6 start to the season. However, they played below .500 for the remainder of the season, but won two more games than the previous year, finishing sixth in the Pacific Division with a 21–29 record.

Starks led the team in scoring with a low team-high average of 13.8 points per game, while Donyell Marshall averaged 11.0 points and 7.1 rebounds per game, Mills provided the team with 10.3 points per game, and Jamison provided with 9.6 points and 6.4 rebounds per game, and was selected to the NBA All-Rookie Second Team. In addition, Bimbo Coles contributed 9.5 points and 4.6 assists per game, while Cummings averaged 9.1 points and 5.1 rebounds per game off the bench, Erick Dampier provided with 8.8 points and 7.6 rebounds per game, and Jason Caffey contributed 8.8 points and 5.9 rebounds per game, but only played 35 games due to an Achilles injury.

Following the season, Coles was traded to the Atlanta Hawks, while Muggsy Bogues signed as a free agent with the Toronto Raptors, Tony Delk signed with the Sacramento Kings, and Felton Spencer signed with the San Antonio Spurs.

Offseason

Draft picks

Roster

Regular season

Season standings

z - clinched division title
y - clinched division title
x - clinched playoff spot

Record vs. opponents

Game log

Player statistics

Season

Awards and records
 Antawn Jamison, NBA All-Rookie Team, 2nd Team

Transactions

Trades

Free agents

Player Transactions Citation:

References

See also
 1998-99 NBA season

Golden State Warriors seasons
Golden
Golden
Golden State